Jeffrey "Jaye" Crockett (born October 16, 1991) is an American professional basketball player for Karhu Basket of the Korisliiga. He played college basketball for Texas Tech before playing professionally in Italy, Japan, Switzerland, Denmark, France, Lebanon, Australia and Greece.

College career
Crockett played four years of college basketball for Texas Tech, where he was named Big 12 All-Academic second team in 2012, All-Big 12 Honorable Mention in 2013, and third-team All-Big 12 in 2014. In 125 games, he made 42 starts and averaged 9.9 points and 5.4 rebounds per game.

Professional career
Crockett began his professional career in Italy, spending the 2014–15 season with Derthona Basket in the Serie A2 Basket. For the 2015–16 season, he started with the Shinshu Brave Warriors in Japan, before finishing with SAM Massagno in Switzerland. For the 2016–17 season, he returned to Italy, splitting the year with Forlì and Trapani. For the 2017–18 season, he played in Denmark with the Bakken Bears and helped the team win the Danish Cup and the Danish League. He subsequently earned Basketligaen Finals MVP honors.

Crockett's 2018–19 season in France with Le Portel was marred by injury, starting with a heel injury at the beginning of the season and then a season-ending toe injury in January 2019.

After starting the 2019–20 season in Lebanon with Anibal Zahle, Crockett signed with the South East Melbourne Phoenix of the Australian NBL as a temporary injury replacement for Tai Wesley on October 16, 2019. He parted ways with the Phoenix on December 6, 2019, following Wesley's return from injury. In January 2020, he joined Astana of the Kazakhstan Basketball Championship. Crockett signed a three-month contract with Fribourg Olympic in Switzerland on August 12. On November 30, he signed with Peristeri of the Greek Basket League.

References

External links

Texas Tech Red Raiders bio
FIBA Europe Cup profile

1991 births
Living people
American expatriate basketball people in Australia
American expatriate basketball people in Denmark
American expatriate basketball people in France
American expatriate basketball people in Italy
American expatriate basketball people in Japan
American expatriate basketball people in Kazakhstan
American expatriate basketball people in Lebanon
American expatriate basketball people in Switzerland
American men's basketball players
Bakken Bears players
Basketball players from New Mexico
Basketball players from New York (state)
BC Astana players
ESSM Le Portel players
Fulgor Libertas Forlì players
Kauhajoen Karhu players
Pallacanestro Trapani players
People from Clovis, New Mexico
Peristeri B.C. players
Power forwards (basketball)
SAM Basket players
Shinshu Brave Warriors players
Small forwards
South East Melbourne Phoenix players
Sportspeople from Watertown, New York
Texas Tech Red Raiders basketball players